is a Japanese video game developer and publisher, and anime producer. The company was formed in October 2011 by the merger of the original Marvelous Entertainment, AQ Interactive, and Liveware.

History

The announcement of merging Marvelous Entertainment Inc., AQ Interactive, Inc., Liveware Inc. in to Marvelous AQL Inc. on October 1, 2011 was originally proposed by Marvelous Entertainment Inc., and went effective on May 10, 2011. The plan would make Marvelous Entertainment Inc. the sole surviving entity after the merger, with Marvelous Entertainment Inc. renamed to Marvelous AQL Inc. on merger day.

On December 22, 2011, MarvelousAQL Inc. announced the establishment of the overseas business department, with investment from Checkpoint Studios Inc., replacing the global strategy room, which dissolved on January 1, 2012.

On October 25, 2012, MarvelousAQL Inc. announced its stock listing on the first section of the Tokyo Stock Exchange, effective on November 1, 2012.

On January 1, 2013, MarvelousAQL Inc. established the amusement business division. The company's digital contents business division and amusement contents development division were moved into amusement business division, and was renamed as amusement development division.

On February 1, 2013, MarvelousAQL Inc. established the digital contents business division.

On July 1, 2014, MarvelousAQL Inc. was renamed as Marvelous Inc.

On March 13, 2015, it was announced that Marvelous would acquire mobile gaming company G-Mode. This includes Data East IPs that G-Mode bought in 2004.

Subsidiaries
: On December 21, 2011, Marvelous AQL Inc. announced Entersphere Inc. becoming a subsidiary of MarvelousAQL Inc. Entersphere Inc. became a Marvelous AQL Inc. subsidiary on 2012-01-11. On 2013-01-17, Entersphere Inc. its relocation to Shinagawa, Tokyo.
Marvelous Europe: On December 22, 2011, MarvelousAQL Inc. announced the establishment of a fully owned MAQL Europe Limited as an online game and mobile content developer and operator in Tunbridge Wells, United Kingdom, in April 2012.  MAQL Europe, under the brand 'Marvelous Games' has released several mobile titles, including RunBot, Eyes Attack, Puzzle Coaster, Conquest Age and Wurdy.
Xseed Games: A carryover subsidiary from AQ Interactive, Inc. as Xseed JKS, Inc. On May 7, 2013, MarvelousAQL Inc. announced the renaming of Xseed JKS, Inc. to Marvelous USA, Inc., after purchasing the Index Digital Media, Inc.'s online business unit and transferred to Xseed JKS, Inc. on 2013-03-31.
: A carryover subsidiary from Marvelous Entertainment Inc..
: A carryover subsidiary from AQ Interactive, Inc..
: A company established in 2017 with the main focus to make the Senran Kagura series. Kenichiro Takaki led the company.
Hakama Inc.: A company established in 2018 by Marvelous. It's led by Story of Seasons and Rune Factory producer Yoshifumi Hashimoto.
Marvelous First Studio: An internal development studio founded by Marvelous in 2017. This studio is known for the development work of Fate/Extella Link, God Eater 3, and Daemon X Machina.

Video games

Nintendo 3DS
 Lord of Magna: Maiden Heaven
 Kaio: King of Pirates (developed by Comcept) (cancelled)
 Harvest Moon: A New Beginning
 PoPoLoCrois Bokumonogatari
 Rune Factory 4 (developed by Neverland)
 Senran Kagura
 Senran Kagura Burst
 Senran Kagura 2: Deep Crimson
 Story of Seasons
 Story of Seasons: Trio of Towns
 Monster Hunter Stories (co-developed with and published by Capcom)

Wii
 Fortune Street
 Harvest Moon: Animal Parade
 Harvest Moon: Tree of Tranquility
 Rune Factory Frontier (developed by Neverland)
 Rune Factory: Tides of Destiny (developed by Neverland)
 Valhalla Knights: Eldar Saga

Nintendo Switch
 Daemon X Machina (Switch version published only in Japan)
 Fate/Extella: The Umbral Star
 Peach Ball: Senran Kagura
 Senran Kagura Reflexions
 Fate/Extella Link
 God Eater 3
 Doraemon Story of Seasons (developed by Marvelous in collaboration with Brownies; Published by Bandai Namco in all regions)
 Rune Factory 4 Special (developed by Hakama with former Neverland employees)
 No More Heroes (Engine Software; originally developed by Grasshopper Manufacture)
 No More Heroes 2: Desperate Struggle (Engine Software; originally developed by Grasshopper Manufacture)
 No More Heroes III (developed by Grasshopper Manufacture, only published in Japan)
 Rune Factory 5 (developed by Hakama)
 Story of Seasons: Friends of Mineral Town
 Story of Seasons: Pioneers of Olive Town
 Monster Hunter Stories 2: Wings of Ruin (co-developed with and published by Capcom)
 Fashion Dreamer (developed by Xseed Games)

PlayStation 3
 Rune Factory: Tides of Destiny (developed by Neverland)
 Nitroplus Blasterz: Heroines Infinite Duel (developed by Examu and co-publish with Nitroplus)

PlayStation Portable
 English Detective Mysteria
 Fate/Extra
 Fate/Extra CCC
 Valhalla Knights
 Valhalla Knights 2

PlayStation Vita
 Browser Sangokushi Next (PlayStation Network)
 IA/VT Colorful
 Muramasa: Rebirth
 New Little King's Story (developed / published by Konami)
 Senran Kagura Bon Appétit!
 Senran Kagura Shinovi Versus
 Soul Sacrifice (co-developed / published by Sony Computer Entertainment)
 Soul Sacrifice Delta (co-developed / published by Sony Computer Entertainment)
 Super Monkey Ball Banana Splitz (published by Sega)
 Uppers
 Valhalla Knights 3 (developed by K2 LLC)
 Valhalla Knights 3 Gold
 Half-Minute Hero: The Second Coming (developed by Opus)
 Senran Kagura: Estival Versus
 Fate/Extella: The Umbral Star
 Net High

PlayStation 4
 Senran Kagura: Estival Versus
 Senran Kagura: Peach Beach Splash
Senran Kagura Burst Re:Newal
 Nitroplus Blasterz: Heroines Infinite Duel (developed by Examu and co-publish with Nitroplus)
 Fate/Extella: The Umbral Star
 God Eater 3 (developed by Marvelous First Studio and published by Bandai Namco Entertainment)
 Fate/Extella Link
 Travis Strikes Again: No More Heroes
 Kandagawa Jet Girls (developed by Honey∞Parade Games, a subsidiary of Marvelous)
 Story of Seasons: Friends of Mineral Town
 Rune Factory 4 Special (developed by Hakama)

Xbox One
 Story of Seasons: Friends of Mineral Town
 Rune Factory 4 Special (developed by Hakama)

Microsoft Windows
 Half-Minute Hero: Super Mega Neo Climax Ultimate Boy
 Skullgirls (formerly)
 Half-Minute Hero: The Second Coming (developed by Opus)
 Fate/Extella: The Umbral Star
 Bullet Witch
 God Eater 3
 Doraemon Story of Seasons (Developed by Marvelous in collaboration with Brownies; Published by Bandai Namco in all regions)
 Travis Strikes Again: No More Heroes
 Daemon X Machina
 Story of Seasons: Friends of Mineral Town
 No More Heroes (Engine Software; originally developed by Grasshopper Manufacture)
 No More Heroes 2: Desperate Struggle (Engine Software; originally developed by Grasshopper Manufacture)

Arcade
 Pokémon Battario
 Pokémon Tretta
 Pokémon Ga-Olé
 Pokémon Mezastar
 Tatakae! Dragon Quest Scan Battlers
 Wacca

Mobile
 RunBot (developed by Bravo Game Studios)
 Puzzle Coaster (developed by Bravo Game Studios)
 Eyes Attack (developed by Alexander Murzanaev)
 Osomatsu-san NEET Island
 Fate/Extella: The Umbral Star
 Fate/Extella Link

Browser game
 Logres of Swords and Sorcery

Anime
Aura: Maryūinkōga Saigo no Tatakai
Cat God
Gunslinger Girl
Gunslinger Girl -Il Teatrino-
Suite PreCure: Take it back! The Miraculous Melody that Connects Hearts!
HHH Triple Ecchi
Humanity Has Declined
(The) Prince of Tennis II
Princess Tutu
Prism Ark
Ring ni Kakero 1: ShadowSaint Beast: Kouin Jojishi Tenshi TanSenran KaguraSenran Kagura: Shinovi Master -Tokyo Yōma-hen-Tokyo MajinTokyo Majin Gakuen Kenpucho: Tou 2nd ActTokyo GhoulWe Without Wings: Under the Innocent SkySengoku Night BloodSeven Deadly Sins''

References

External links

 
LINKTHINK Inc. page

Video game companies established in 2011
Mass media companies established in 2011
Anime companies
Companies listed on the Tokyo Stock Exchange
Japanese companies established in 2011
 
Tencent
Mass media companies based in Tokyo
Software companies based in Tokyo
Video game companies of Japan
Video game development companies
Video game publishers
Japanese brands